The 54th Golden Globe Awards, honoring the best in film and television for 1996, were held on January 19, 1997 at the Beverly Hilton. The nominations were announced on December 19, 1996.

Winners and nominees

Film 

The following films received multiple nominations:

The following films received multiple wins:

Television 
The following programs received multiple nominations:

The following programs received multiple wins

Ceremony

Presenters 

 Halle Berry
 Jeff Bridges
 Nicolas Cage
 Drew Carey
 Tom Cruise
 Jane Curtin
 Ted Danson
 Faye Dunaway
 Kelsey Grammer
 Nicole Kidman
 Heather Locklear
 Jada Pinkett Smith
 Cybill Shepherd
 Gary Sinise
 Mira Sorvino
 Sharon Stone
 John Travolta
 Christopher Walken

Cecil B. DeMille Award 
Dustin Hoffman

Awards breakdown 
The following networks received multiple nominations:

The following networks received multiple wins:

See also
 69th Academy Awards
 17th Golden Raspberry Awards
 3rd Screen Actors Guild Awards
 48th Primetime Emmy Awards
 49th Primetime Emmy Awards
 50th British Academy Film Awards
 51st Tony Awards
 1996 in film
 1996 in American television

References

054
1996 film awards
1996 television awards
January 1997 events in the United States
Golden